The Grand Master of the Order of St Michael and St George is the second most senior officer of the Order of St Michael and St George. The Grand Master is appointed by the British monarch as Sovereign of the Order of St Michael and St George and ranks immediately after the Sovereign. 

There have been nine Grand Masters since the order was founded in 1818. These are:

1818–1824: Sir Thomas Maitland (Sovereigns: King George III and King George IV)
1825–1850: The 1st Duke of Cambridge (Sovereigns: King George IV, King William IV, Queen Victoria)
1850–1904: The 2nd Duke of Cambridge (Sovereigns: Queen Victoria and King Edward VII)
1904–1910: The Prince of Wales (Sovereign: King Edward VII)  – In 1910, the Prince of Wales ceased to be Grand Master when he acceeded the throne as King George V and became Sovereign himself 
1910–1917: (vacant) (Sovereign: King George V)
1917–1936: The Prince of Wales (Sovereign: King George V) –  In 1936, the Prince of Wales ceased to be Grand Master when he acceeded the throne as King Edward VIII and became Sovereign himself 
1936–1957: The Earl of Athlone (Sovereigns: King Edward VIII, King George VI, Queen Elizabeth II)
1957–1959: The Earl of Halifax (Sovereign: Queen Elizabeth II)
1959–1967: The Earl Alexander of Tunis (Sovereign: Queen Elizabeth II)
1967–present: The Duke of Kent (Sovereign: Queen Elizabeth II, King Charles III)

Ceremonial officers in the United Kingdom
Order of St Michael and St George
Saint Michael and Saint George